The Falls River is a  stream that drains Baraga County in the Upper Peninsula of Michigan in the United States, and flows into Lake Superior in the community of L'Anse. Its name derives from the fact that it flows over slate bedrock with a gradient (rate of descent) that increases as it nears its mouth, cascading over numerous slate waterfalls.

The Falls is a picturesque stream that has been run by expert kayakers numerous times. As a whitewater stream, it rates a class 4+ on the International Scale of River Difficulty.

References

External links
 http://www.americanwhitewater.org/content/River_detail_id_2592_

Rivers of Baraga County, Michigan
Rivers of Michigan
Tributaries of Lake Superior